Ell is a surname.

People with the surname
 Agnes Ell (1917–2003), New Zealand cricketer
 Bob Ell (born ), Australian property developer
 Carl Stephens Ell (1887–1981), American academic administrator
 Darrell Ell, Canadian curler and coach
 Harry Ell (1862–1934), New Zealand politician
 Jade Ell, Swedish musician
 Jimmy Ell (1915-2007), New Zealand cricketer
 Lindsay Ell (born 1989), Canadian musician